Firas Tlass (born 20 August 1960) is a Syrian businessman and a member of a significant Sunni family who had close relations with former Syrian President Hafez al-Assad, but defected to the rebels during the Syrian Civil War.

Early life and education
Firas Tlass was born in Damascus on 20 August 1960. He is the second eldest child of Mustafa Tlass, a former Syrian Minister of Defense from 1972 to 2004 of Circassian and Turkish origin. Next to the Assad clan, his family was the most famous Sunni family in Syria, known for supporting the government. On the other hand, the members of his family worked for the Ottoman suzerains as well as French occupiers after the First World War. Manaf Tlass, who was a senior military official and defected in July 2012, is his younger brother.

He attended Ecole Laique in Damascus, graduating in 1978. He studied business administration at Damascus University, graduating with a bachelor of arts degree in economy in 1984. He went to France to study French and obtained a degree in commerce from Paris.

Career
Tlass is described as a business tycoon and Syria's sugar king. He was one of the richest men in Syria. Tlass was a significant supporter and also, beneficiary of Bashar al-Assad's liberal economy policies over the past decade. 

Tlass founded Min Ajl Suriyya (MAS) (“For Syria” in English) in 1984. MAS deals with different commercial activities, ranging from roasting coffee beans to producing metal, canned food, and dairy products. In 2004, Tlass also began to provide financial assistance to the website Syria News that was owned by the Syrian Economic Center (SEC). In 2010, he launched EFG Hermes Syria with EFG Hermes, the leading Egyptian investment bank in the Arab world. It was reported that EFG Hermes Syria was a partnership between EFG Hermes (70%) and  Firas Tlass (30%). Tlass became the chairman of the firm. Additionally, Tlass was the local joint venture partner for French cement company Lafarge. He is also Chairman of Palmyra-SODIC. His other business activity is the Palmyra real estate development company, of which he is the general manager.

Since 1999, Tlass started some business relations with Iraq and participated in some commercial and industrial contracts between Syria and Iraq. 

Tlass is a former member of the Ba'ath Party. However, in 2005, he and another Baath member, Abdel Nour, argued that they supported multi-party elections and ending the Baath monopoly on power in Syria. Firas Tlass also said that the relations with the US should be better. In 2012, the New York Times reported that Firas and his brother, Brigadier General Manaf Tlass had defected. They were regarded by Bashar al-Assad as peers and friends.

Controversy
In 2012-2014 LafargeHolcim's factory in Jalabiya, northern Syria, continued to operate as the Syrian war raged around it. Factory chief Bruno Pescheux has admitted Lafarge paid up to $100,000 a month to Syrian tycoon Firas Tlass, a former minority shareholder who gave cash to armed factions in order to keep the factory open.

Defection and views
It was reported by AFP that Firas and his father, former defense minister Mustafa Tlass, arrived in Paris in March 2012. But their move was not seen as a defection. However, there is another report on his defection. It states that Mustafa Tlas and his son, Firas, both left Syria since the revolt against Assad began in 2011. It is added that Mustafa Tlass left for France for what he described as medical treatment, while Firas left Syria for Egypt in 2011. There is another report, indicating that Firas is in Dubai. It is also argued that Firas in France with his father. There is another report, arguing that Firas travels between the United Arab Emirates and France. His younger brother Manaf Tlass, a Syrian officer, defected from the Assad government and fled to Turkey and on 6 July 2012, he went to France from Turkey.

On 26 July 2012, Firas Tlass expressed his support for Bashar Al Assad's resignation. He further declared that he had provided the Farouq Brigades in the Free Syrian Army, commanded by his cousin Abdul Razzak Tlass, with the humanitarian and relief aid. On 8 March 2013, he told Al Arabiya that Syria had had secret business deals with Israel.

Personal life
Tlass is married to Lubna Alsoufi, a member of one of the leading Sunni families from Lattakia. 

He was married before to Rania Al Jabiri since 1984 until they divorced in March 2012. He has five children with her: Yara (born 1989), Mira and Lara (twins, born  1991), Yasmine (born 1998) and Mustafa (born 2000).

References

1960 births
Arab Socialist Ba'ath Party – Syria Region politicians
Living people
Syrian people of Circassian descent
Syrian people of Turkish descent
Damascus University alumni
Syrian businesspeople
Syrian Sunni Muslims
People of the Syrian civil war
Syrian defectors
Firas
Syrian corporate directors
20th-century Syrian people
21st-century Syrian people